Edward Jerningham Wakefield (25 June 1820 – 3 March 1879), known as Jerningham Wakefield, was the only son of Edward Gibbon Wakefield. As such, he was closely associated with his father's interest in colonisation.  He worked for the New Zealand Company and later was a member of the Canterbury Association. He was active as a politician in New Zealand, both at national and provincial level, but became an alcoholic and died penniless in an old people's home.

Early life

Wakefield was born in London in 1820. His parents were Edward Gibbon Wakefield and Eliza Anne Frances Pattle, but his mother died within days of his birth.  Together with his sister Nina, he was mostly brought up by Catherine Torlesse, his father's sister and mother of Charles Torlesse.  Wakefield was known by his middle name and educated at Bruce Castle School and King's College London.

Later life

In 1839 he accompanied his uncle, Colonel William Wakefield to New Zealand on the New Zealand Company ship Tory. This expedition was an advance party seeking a suitable site to found a colony in the Cook Strait area. In 1840 he explored the coast from Wellington to Whanganui River guided by a group of Maori he referred to as his "slaves".

Jerningham Wakefield had intended to stay in New Zealand for only a few months but he found the growth of the new colony so fascinating that it was four years before he returned to England in 1844.  He quickly assembled his journals and they were published as Adventures in New Zealand in April 1845.  The favourable picture he presented of the colony founded by the New Zealand Company helped the company to avoid censure in the House of Commons.

For the next five years Jerningham Wakefield lived a dissipated life in London. In September 1845 he attended a lecture at the Royal Adelaide Gallery in London by the tattooed Pākehā Māori, Barnet Burns, who had previously applied without success to join the New Zealand Company on the Tory. He joined the Canterbury Association on 6 May 1848, but resigned again on 8 November 1849. Then, in 1850, faced with bankruptcy, Wakefield sailed for New Zealand, this time with the advance party for the Canterbury settlement.

He entered politics, in New Zealand's 1st Parliament, as one of the two members for Christchurch Country for 1853–1855; and was a member of the 5th Parliament for Christchurch City East for 1871–1875. He moved to Wellington in 1855 to be near his sick father, and represented the City of Wellington in the Provincial Council from 1857 to 1861.

He stood in the 1875 election in the  electorate, where six candidates were contesting three available positions, but he came fifth and was thus defeated.

He had a financial interest in the earliest daily newspapers.

Because of his increasing alcoholism his behaviour was very erratic and he was an embarrassment to his supporters. He was one of the MPs sometimes locked in small rooms at Parliament by Whips to keep them sober enough to vote in critical divisions, though in 1872 this was defeated when political opponents lowered a bottle of whisky down the chimney to him. Gradually over the next few years he dissipated his wealth and substance and destroyed his health.

He died, penniless, in Ashburton, New Zealand in 1879.

References

External links

|-

1820 births
1879 deaths
Members of the New Zealand House of Representatives
Members of the Wellington Provincial Council
Members of the Canterbury Association
Unsuccessful candidates in the 1875–1876 New Zealand general election
People from London
English emigrants to New Zealand
New Zealand MPs for South Island electorates
New Zealand MPs for Christchurch electorates
People educated at Bruce Castle School
Alumni of King's College London
19th-century New Zealand politicians
Jerningham